Arrhenoseius is a genus of mites in the family Ascidae.

Species
 Arrhenoseius gloriosus Walter & Lindquist, 2001

References

Ascidae